The Anthracite Railway  was a short line railroad in the state of Pennsylvania. It was formed in 1983 to operate various former Reading Company lines that it leased from the state. The Reading Blue Mountain and Northern Railroad took over the leases in 1988–1989.

Lines 
The Anthracite Railway operated three railway lines. All three were former Reading Company lines:

 the Allentown Branch, between Topton and Kutztown
 the Colebrookdale Branch, between Pottstown and Boyertown
 the Perkiomen Branch, between Pennsburg and Emmaus

The company commenced operations on July 31, 1983, succeeding Conrail as operator. Pennsylvania owned all three lines. The Reading Blue Mountain and Northern Railroad replaced the Anthracite Railway as the operator of the Perkiomen Branch in 1988 and the other two branches in 1989.

References

Further reading 
 

Defunct Pennsylvania railroads
Railway companies established in 1983
Railway companies disestablished in 1989